Make Me an Offer is a 1954 Eastmancolor British comedy film directed by Cyril Frankel and starring Peter Finch, Adrienne Corri, Rosalie Crutchley and Finlay Currie. It is based on the 1952 novel of the same title by Wolf Mankowitz. It was distributed by British Lion Films.

Production
The film was based on a novel Make Me an Offer by William Mankowitz which was published in 1952. It was Mankowitz's first novel and was autobiographical – he had been an antique dealer since 1947. The book became a best seller.

The lead role went to Peter Finch. It was Peter Finch's first starring role in a British film. (He had just made Elephant Walk and Father Brown.) 
In April 1954 Diane Cilento was announced as his co star but she does not appear in the final film. She was replaced by Rosalind Crutchley.

Filming started 22 April 1954 at Beaconsfield Studios. The film's sets were designed by the art director Denis Wreford. They had the film finished by August 1954 when Finch called it:
Without a doubt the best film I've ever acted in. It is adult. One might say, if one weren't a little frightened of using words, truly artistic. It is the longest part I've ever had, since I'm in every scene but one. So if anyone takes a dislike to me in the first five minutes, he is in for a bad evening. Director Cyril Frankel is. I think, one of the most able and most stimulating directors I've ever worked for. In fact, the whole of 'Group Three' Studios, where we made the film, is exciting and alive with rising talent and new ideas. It is fun because they all know they're going somewhere. Rosalie Crutchley, who plays my wife in 'Make Me An Offer,' is a splendid actress.

Plot
On a childhood trip to the British Museum, young Charlie (Richard O'Sullivan) falls instantly in love with the Portland Vase, and his passion for it leads to him eventually becoming a dealer in English pottery. Whilst still a boy he sees a newspaper cutting that describes the theft, 50 years before in 1886, of art treasures, including a perfect green Portland Vase created by Josiah Wedgwood in 1783. Years later and struggling in his profession, Charlie (Peter Finch) learns of a room full of Wedgwood in a country mansion up for demolition. Lacking funds, he turns to Abe Sparta, a successful businessman and the owner of the house in which Charlie, his wife Bella and their two children live. He takes the train to view the contents before the auction of the mansion's contents. To his great disgust, Charlie finds only French fakes.

When Nicky, a pretty (if absentminded and clumsy) redhead, walks to the neighbouring cottage, Charlie follows. He purchases a worthless porcelain piece from her, just because she needs two pounds. She invites him to look around to see if he might find something of value. Nicky is looking after Sir John, an aged relation with a wicked reputation. Charlie conceals his astonishment upon spotting two of the art objects stolen along with the vase. Then he finds the Portland Wedgwood vase gathering dust in the attic. Charlie offers Nicky £10 for it, but she wants £100 for a fur coat. He reluctantly agrees, but she refuses to accept a cheque.

Charlie arranges for other bidders to come to the auction, including Wendl (a long-time bitter rival of Sparta's) and Armstrong and Armstrong's American clients, Mindel and Sweeting. At the auction, Charlie starts playing off the three bidders against and with each other, to his great profit, obtaining enough in this underhanded way to pay Nicky. When she demands £150, however, Charlie goes to Sir John and persuades him to perform the first good deed of his life and give him the vase for nothing (the rightful owner having died and left no heir).  Charlie does give a delighted Nicky the promised £100 anyway. With some of the rest, Charlie buys his wife a long-promised fur coat.

Cast

 Peter Finch as Charlie
 Adrienne Corri as Nicky
 Rosalie Crutchley as Bella
 Finlay Currie as Abe Sparta
 Meier Tzelniker as Wendl
 Ernest Thesiger as Sir John
 Wilfrid Lawson as Charlie's Father
 Anthony Nicholls as Auctioneer
 Alfie Bass as Fred Frames
 Guy Middleton as Armstrong
 Vic Wise as Sweeting
 Mark Baker as Mindel
 Jane Wenham as Dobbie 
 Richard O'Sullivan as Charlie as a boy
 Cyril Smith as Auctioneer
 Eric Francis as 	Auctioneer's Assistant
 Roger Maxwell as Man Bidding at Auction 
 Helena Pickard as Lady On Train
 John Le Mesurier as Mr. Toshack
 Leonard Williams as Edward H. Whybrow

Critical reception
The film was screened for London critics in December 1954.

TV Guide dismissed the film as "About as much fun as watching a grandfather clock"; whereas Sky Movies called it an "Engaging comedy", with an "amusing script", concluding, "Far from least, there's that splendid veteran Ernest Thesiger, here as a great-great-grandfather whose past life has not been exactly without reproach...". Bosley Crowther, the critic for The New York Times described it and another film on a double bill as "unpretentious British comedies."

1959 Musical
The novel was adapted into a musical with book by Mankowitz and music and lyrics by Monty Norman and David Heneker. Originally performed at Joan Littlewood's Theatre Royal Stratford East in October 1959, it transferred to the West End's New Theatre in December 1959. The original London cast featured Daniel Massey, Dilys Laye and Martin Miller. The musical was successful and there was talk it would be adapted into a film. It received the Evening Standard Award for Best Musical of 1959.

1966 TV Adaptation
The novel was adapted for the BBC in 1966.

References

External links
 
Complete copy of book of musical at Internet Archive

1954 films
1954 comedy films
British comedy films
Films based on British novels
Films directed by Cyril Frankel
Films scored by John Addison
Films with screenplays by Wolf Mankowitz
1955 comedy films
1955 films
Films shot at Beaconsfield Studios
British Lion Films films
Films set in London
1950s English-language films
1950s British films